Midyat is a town in the Midyat District of Mardin Province in Turkey. The ancient city is the center of a centuries-old Hurrian town in Upper Mesopotamia. In its long history, the city of Midyat has been ruled by various different leaders and nations. It had a population of 83,148 in 2021.

In the modern era, the town is populated by Assyrians, Kurds and Mhallami people. The old Estel neighborhood is about 80 to 85% Kurdish-populated.

History
The history of Midyat can be traced back to the Hurrians during the third millennium. Ninth century BC Assyrian tablets refer to Midyat as Matiate, or city of caves due to the caves at eleth 3 km away from the city where the earliest inhabitants lived. Many different empires had ruled over Midyat including the Mitannians, Assyrians, Arameans, Armenians, Medes, Persians, Greeks, Romans, Byzantines, Abbasids, Seljuks and Ottomans. Below the town exists an underground city named Matiate, which is assumed to have been in use for about 1,900 years and at its peak been inhabited by up to 70,000 people.

The leading Syriac Orthodox family, the Safars, were highly placed in the Deksuri confederation, while other local Syriacs were aligned with the opposing, anti-government Heverkan confederation. In mid-1915, Christians in Midyat considered resistance after hearing about massacres elsewhere, but the local Syriac Orthodox community initially refused to support this. Hanne Safar Pasha was persuaded to break with other Christian leaders who wanted to organize an uprising in Midyat. Shortly thereafter, Safar was killed after all male members of the pacifist Protestant Hermez family. In late June, kaymakam Nuri Bey disappeared, likely executed by Mehmed Reshid after refusing to massacre local Christians. On 21 June, 100 Christian men (mostly Armenians and Protestants) were arrested, tortured for confessions implicating others, and executed outside the city; this panicked the Syriac Orthodox population. Local people refused to hand over their arms, attacked government offices, and cut telegraph lines; local Arab and Kurdish tribes were recruited by the Ottoman government to attack the Christians. The town was pacified in early August after weeks of bloody urban warfare which killed hundreds of Christians (Assyrians and Armenians). Survivors fled east to the more-defensible Iwardo, which held out successfully with the food aid of local Yazidis.

Demographics

Population

Midyat, in Diyarbekir vilayet, was the only town in the Ottoman Empire with an Syriac majority, although divided between Syriac Orthodox, Chaldeans, and Protestants. Midyat is an historic centre of the Syriacs in Turkey, and as late as the Syriac/Aramean genocide in 1915 they constituted the majority of the city's population. During the early 20th century, the Syriac population of the city started to gradually diminish due to emigration, but the community was still very large. The Syriacs of Tur Abdin were the only significant population of Christians outside of Istanbul, until 1979, when panic ensued over an act of war and an exodus of local Christians overtook the city as a result, because a mayor and major Syriac figure in Turabdin of the city of Kerboran, now named Dargecit, was assassinated and replaced with a Kurdish representative against the peoples will. The Syriacs up until then had control over the local government, and could therefore unify to resist threats. Panic ensued as the local Muslim population made a symbolic declaration of war against the Syriac people and soon after the takeover, local Mhallami and Kurdish inhabitants started immigrating into the traditionally Syriac areas, causing a demographic shift which – along with the start of the Turkey-PKK conflict a few years later in 1984 – sounded a death toll to the community not only here, but in all of Tur Abdin. From a 1975 population of 50,000 comprising 10% of Mardin Province's demographic structure: barely 2,000 were left by the end of the conflict in 1999. Now only around 3–5,000 live in Tur Abdin, with the other 15–17,000 living in Istanbul and other still functioning Syriac Diocese like Adiyaman, Harput, and Diyarbakir.

The churches and houses belonging to the Christians have been preserved although many of them are empty, with their owners living away in Europe. At present 500 Syriac Christians live in Midyat, and they have been joined by 100–300 Syriac refugees fleeing the Syrian Civil War who have settled in the city and region according to different estimates, and comprise 1% of the population of Midyat. There are five churches in the city, and all are Syriac.

Economy

Midyat is the regional center of commerce for the district, and is one of the largest cities in Mardin Province. Similarly with Mardin, the city is known for its Syriac handicrafts such as carpets, towels and other cloth goods. More specific to the city is its Syriac silver crafts called telkari, which are handcrafted filigreed ornaments. To the east of the city there is a winery that makes traditional Syriac wine: a wine native to the region. Another staple in the Midyat market is its bulgur, which is a cereal food derived from wheat.

Climate
Midyat, part of the province of Mardin, has a semi-arid climate with very hot and dry summers and cold, wet, and occasionally snowy winters. Temperatures in summer usually increase to 40 °C – 50 °C (104 °F – 122 °F) due to Mardin being situated right next to the border with Syria. Snowfall is quite common between the months of December and March, snowing for a week or two. Mardin has over 3,000 hours of sun per year. The highest recorded temperature is 48.8 °C.

Gallery

References

Sources

External links
 Study on the spoken Arabic of Midyat, in the Arabic language

Populated places in Mardin Province
Tur Abdin
Assyrian communities in Turkey
Places of the Assyrian genocide
Mhallami
Kurdish settlements in Mardin Province